The Interpretation of Murder, published in 2006, is the first novel by the American law professor Jed Rubenfeld. The book is written in the first person perspective of Dr. Stratham Younger, supposedly an American psychoanalyst. Other events where he is not present he is informed upon so that he has enough knowledge to write and comment on them.

Plot summary
On the morning after Sigmund Freud arrives in New York City on his first – and only – visit to the United States in 1909, a stunning débutante is found bound and strangled in her penthouse apartment, high above Broadway. The following night, another beautiful heiress, Nora Acton, is discovered tied to a chandelier in her parents' home, viciously wounded and unable to speak or to recall her ordeal. Soon Freud and his American disciple, Stratham Younger, are enlisted to help Miss Acton recover her memory, and to piece together the killer's identity. It is a riddle that will test their skills to the limit and lead them on a journey into the darkest places of the city, and of the human mind.

Characters
Sigmund Freud
Carl Jung
Abraham Brill
Rose Brill
Sándor Ferenczi
George B. McClellan, Mayor of New York City
Stratham Younger, Dr. (fictional). The first person story teller in the book.
Nora Acton (fictional). Based on Freud's case study of "Dora" (Ida Bauer)
Mr. Harcourt Acton and Mrs. Acton, Nora's parents (fictional)
George Banwell, Building contractor (fictional)
Clara Banwell, George Banwell's wife (fictional)
Jimmy Littlemore, Detective (fictional)
Charles Hugel, Coroner (fictional)
Granville Stanley Hall
Ernest Jones
Smith Ely Jeliffe, Dr, Publisher
The "Triumvirate":
Charles Loomis Dana
Bernard Sachs
M. Allen Starr
Elizabeth Riverford (fictional)
Mr. and Mrs. Biggs (fictional), the Acton family's servants
Betty Longobardi (fictional)
Chong Sing
Leon Ling, alias William Leon
Seamus Malley (fictional)
Harry Thaw
Elsie Sigel, granddaughter of General Franz Sigel
Mr. and Mrs. Sigel, Elsie's parents
Mabel, Mr. and Mrs. Sigel's niece
Charles Johnson
Susan A.(Susie) Merrill, Brothel owner
Mr. and Mrs. Hyslop
Mr. and Mrs. Fish
Charles Becker, Police Sergeant
Louis Riviere

Places, landmarks and buildings
Manhattan Bridge
Gramercy Park
Clark University
Metropolitan Museum
Hotel Manhattan
Waldorf-Astoria (not current)
Coney Island
The Balmoral Hotel (fictional)
Gillender Building
The Players Club
Matteawan State Hospital for the Criminally Insane

External links

2006 American novels
American mystery novels
Cultural depictions of Sigmund Freud
Fiction set in 1909
Historical mystery novels
Novels set in the 1900s
Novels set in New York City
Henry Holt and Company books
2006 debut novels